James Theobald (1829–10  March 1894) was a British Conservative politician from Essex, who represented Romford in the House of Commons of the United Kingdom from 1886 to 1894.

James Theobald of Grays Thurrock and of Havering atte Bower, Essex, was the eldest son of James Theobald of Hyde Abbey in Hampshire, and Sarah, daughter of the Reverend Charles Richards, Canon of Winchester. He was born in Winchester in 1829. He was educated at Trinity College, Oxford, where he matriculated 30 May 1849, age nineteen, took his B.A. and M.A. in 1859, and became a Student of the Inner Temple in 1851. In 1865 he married Mable Laura, daughter of W.R. Eaton Esq. of Cheshire. He was Deputy Lieutenant for Essex, Lord of the Manor of Grays Thurrock and a large landowner in the county. 

In 1856, James Theobald was part of the expedition led by Robert Stuart to the summit of Mount Ararat, along with Major Alick Fraser, the Rev. Walter Thursby and John Evans.

A Conservative, and opposed to home rule, he represented the Romford Division of Essex in Parliament from 1886 to 1894. He entered parliament on the Conservative ticket for Romford at the 1886 general election, and was reportedly very popular and hard working.

On March 9, 1894, Theobald was rushing through Romford Station to catch the 2:16pm train to London. He attempted to board a carriage, but the train had already started moving, and he tripped and fell between the footboard and the platform.

The station staff quickly stopped the train and pulled the severely injured Theobald to safety.

In this situation today, we would not hesitate to call an ambulance, or take him to an A&E department.

However, Romford lacked both of these in 1894, so its MP (at his own request) was instead carried on a stretcher to the Golden Lion Hotel. This may seem odd, but the Golden Lion could provide a comfortable bed, and was convenient for doctors and chemists to reach.

That is not to say that there were no hospitals in Romford at the time. The Victoria Cottage Hospital had opened in Pettits Lane just six years earlier, however it was mainly used by GPs to perform minor operations. Another option was the new infirmary at Romford Union Workhouse, opened the previous year – although this was out of the question for a man of Theobald's status.

Two local doctors and a surgeon from Guy's Hospital were summoned to the Golden Lion, and diagnosed four fractured ribs and wounds to the head and body, as well as internal injuries - the Honourable Gentleman would not last the night. To make his last hours as comfortable as possible, straw was laid in the road outside that night to deaden the traffic noise. After a brief rally, James Theobald died at 6.02 the next morning.

References 

1829 births
1894 deaths
People from Romford
UK MPs 1886–1892
UK MPs 1892–1895
Conservative Party (UK) MPs for English constituencies
Railway accident deaths in England